A number of Arabs participated in efforts to help save Jewish residents of Arab lands from the Holocaust while fascist regimes controlled the territory. From June 1940 through May 1943, Axis powers, namely Germany and Italy, controlled large portions of North Africa. Approximately 1 percent of the Jewish residents, about 4,000 to 5,000 Jews, of that territory were murdered by these regimes during this period. The relatively small percentage of Jewish casualties, as compared to the 60 percent of European Jews who were murdered during the Holocaust, is largely due to the successful Allied North African Campaign and the repelling of the Axis powers from North Africa.

No occupied country in Africa or Europe was free of collaboration with the genocide campaign against the Jews, but this was often more common in European countries than Arab ones. The offer made to Algerians by colonial French officials to take over confiscated Jewish property found many French settlers ready to profit from the scheme, but no Arab participated and, in the capital, Algiers itself, Muslim clerics openly declared their opposition to the idea. While some Arabs collaborated with the Axis powers by working as guards in labour camps, others risked their own lives to attempt to save Jews from persecution and genocide.

Arab rescue efforts were not limited to the Middle East – Si Kaddour Benghabrit, the rector of the Great Mosque of Paris, according to different sources, helped from 100 to 500 Jews disguise themselves as Muslims. There are examples of non-Arab Muslim populations assisting Jews to escape from the Holocaust in Europe, in Albania for example. In September 2013, Yad Vashem declared an Egyptian doctor, Mohammed Helmy, one of the Righteous Among the Nations for saving the life of Anna Gutman (née Boros), putting himself at personal risk for three years, and for helping her mother Julie, her grandmother Cecilie Rudnik, and her stepfather Georg Wehr, to survive the holocaust. Helmy is the first Arab to have been so honoured.

In North Africa

Si Ali Sakkat
During his career Si Ali Sakkat held positions of a government minister and mayor of Tunis. By 1940 Si Ali Sakkat was enjoying retirement on his farm at the base of Jebel Zaghouan. There was a forced labor camp for the Jews not far away from Sakkat's farm. Jews from the camp were put to work repairing an airfield, which was regularly bombed by Allies. Arabs saw how Germans who ran the camp beat Jews on a regular basis. One night, during an especially heavy battle, sixty Jewish laborers were able to escape. The first structure they encountered was the wall of Sakkat's farm. They knocked on the gate, and were allowed shelter and food. They were also allowed to stay until the liberation of Tunisia by Allied forces.

Khaled Abdul-Wahab

Abdul-Wahab was a son of a well-known Tunisian historian. He was 32 years old when the Germans occupied Tunisia. He was an interlocutor between the Nazis and the population of the coastal town of Mahdia. When he overheard German officers planning to rape a local Jewish woman, Odette Boukhris, he hid the woman and her family, along with about two dozen more Jewish families, at his farm outside of town. The families stayed there for four months, until the occupation ended. Abdul-Wahab is sometimes called the Arab Oskar Schindler.  In 2009 two trees were dedicated to honor his bravery. One tree was planted in Adas Israel Garden of the Righteous in Washington, D.C., the other was planted in the Garden of the Righteous Worldwide. His daughter Faiza attended the ceremony in Milan.

Shaykh Taieb el-Okbi
Taieb el-Okbi was a member of Algerian Islah (Reform) Party, and a friend of the prominent Algerian reformist Abdelhamid Ben Badis, who was tolerant of different religions and cultures. Ben Badis founded and directed the Algerian League of Muslims and Jews. He died before Vichy forces occupied Algeria, but Taieb el-Okbi took his place. Taieb el-Okbi discovered that the leaders of the pro-fascist group the Légion Français des Combattants were planning a pogrom against Jews with the help of Muslim troops. He tried to prevent it and even issued a fatwa ordering Muslims not to attack Jews. His actions were compared to French Archbishops Jules-Géraud Saliège and Pierre-Marie Gerlier, whose efforts saved scores of Jews in Europe.

Muslim rescue efforts in Europe
Albania, a predominantly Muslim country, saved almost all of its resident Jewish population. The survival rate in the then-Yugoslavian province of Kosovo was 60%, making it one of the areas with the highest Jewish survival rate in Europe.

Refik Veseli
Most of the 2,000 Jews of Albania were sheltered by the mostly Muslim population. Refik Veseli, a 17-year-old Muslim boy, took in the family of Mosa and Gabriela Mandil, including their five-year-old son Gavra and his sister Irena, then refugees from Belgrade but originally from Novi Sad, for whom he had been working as an apprentice in their Tirana photographic shop. When the Germans took over from the Italians, he took them, and another Jewish family on a long night journey to his family village at Kruja, where they were protected by his parents until the war's end, some 9 months later, even against Enver Hoxha's partisans. His example inspired his whole village to risk their lives in order to protect Jews. On receiving Gavra Mandil's request for them to be recognized as righteous, the authorities of Yad Vashem inscribed both Refka and Drita Veseli in 1988 among the Righteous. The story became better known after Albania's surviving Jewish community was allowed to perform aliyah in the 1990s.

Many survivors told how their Albanian hosts vied for the privilege of offering sanctuary, on the grounds that it was an Islamic ethical obligation. Since that date, a further 50 Albanians have been registered among the ranks of the Righteous.

See also 
 Relations between Nazi Germany and the Arab world

References

External links
Saviours in a strange world
New booklet reveals Muslim acts of heroism during Holocaust

Rescue of Jews during the Holocaust
The Holocaust in Tunisia
Albania in World War II
The Holocaust
Arab history
Islam and Judaism